Robber language may refer to:

 Thieves' cant
 Rövarspråket, Swedish language game